This is a list of lists of people by occupation. Each is linked to a list of notable people within that profession.

Lists of lists 

Actors
Engineers
Musicians
Scientists

List of... 

Accordionists
Africanists
Anthropologists
Archaeologists
Architects
Women architects
Archivists
Artists
Astronauts
Astronauts by name
Astronauts by selection
Space travelers by name
Astronomers and astrophysicists
Au pairs
Aviators
Biochemists
Biographers
Biologists
Botanists
Business theorists
Cardiologists
Caricaturists
Cartographers
Cartoonists
Censors
Centenarians
Chefs
Chemists
Chess grandmasters
Chess players
Chief executive officers
Choreographers
Christian theologians
Civil rights leaders
Climbers
Clinical psychologists
Clowns
Club DJs
Coleopterists
Comedians
Comic creators
Composers
Computer scientists
Copywriters
Cosmologists
Crime bosses
Criminal justice academics
Critical theorists
Critics
Dance personalities
Dancers
Dentists
Dermatologists
Directors
Economists
Entomologists
Entrepreneurs
Essayists
Ethicists
Explorers
Fashion designers
Feminist economists
Feminists
Footwear designers
Game designers
Gardeners
Geneticists
Geographers
Geologists
Geometers
Geophysicists
Graphic designers
Guerrillas
Hackers
Herpetologists
Historians
Humorists
Illustrators
Internet entrepreneurs
Inventors
Journalists
Jurists
Landscape architects
Lexicographers
Librarians
Linguists
Logicians
Luthiers
Magicians
Marine biologists
Maritime explorers
Mathematical probabilists
Mathematicians
Media proprietors
Meteorologists
Military writers
Mineralogists
Musicologists
Neurochemists
Neurologists
Neuroscientists
News presenters
Newspaper columnists
Novelists by nationality
Nurses
Oenologists
Office-holders
Ornithologists
Painters
Paleontologists
Patent attorneys
Pathologists
Pharmacists
Philanthropists
Philatelists
Philosophers
Photochemists
Photographers
Women photographers
Photojournalists
Physicians
Physicists
Pirates
Playwrights
Poets
Political scientists
Political theorists
Porn stars
Programmers
Psephologists
Psychoanalytical theorists
Psychologists
Railroad executives
Rheologists
Role-playing game designers
Runologists
Russian earth scientists
Sailors
School counselors
Sculptors
Female sculptors
Sea captains
Show business families
Singer-songwriters
Soap-makers
Social psychologists
Social theorists
Sociologists
Soil scientists
Sports announcers
Sports writers
Sportsmen
Stand-up comedians
Statisticians
Strippers
Studio potters
Syndicated columnists
Talk show hosts
Tattoo artists
Telegraphists
Televangelists
Television presenters
Television reporters
Theatre directors
Theoretical Physicists
Translators
Ufologists
Undersea explorers
Urban planners
Veterinarians
Vexillologists
Video game designers
Writers
YouTubers

Notes

 
Occupations by type